Heritage Foods Limited (commonly known as Heritage Foods) is one of the largest private sector dairy enterprises in Southern India.

History 
The Heritage Group was founded in 1992 by Telugu Desam Party Chief and former Chief Minister of Andhra Pradesh Shri Nara Chandrababu Naidu, with three-business divisions viz., Dairy, Retail and Agri under its flagship Company Heritage Foods Limited (HFL), one infrastructure subsidiary - Heritage Infra Developers Limited and other associate Companies viz., Heritage Finlease Limited, Heritage International Limited and Heritage Agro Marine Private Limited. The annual turnover has crossed $200 million USD during FY 2008'09.

Heritage’s milk products have market presence in Andhra Pradesh, Karnataka, Kerala, Tamil Nadu, Maharashtra, Delhi, Rajasthan and Punjab. It has retail stores across Bengaluru, Chennai, Hyderabad and Visakhapatnam. Integrated agri operations are in Chittoor and Medak Districts and these are backbone to retail operations.

In the year 1994, HFL went to Public Issue to raise resources, which was oversubscribed 54 times and its shares are listed on BSE (Stock Code: 519552) and NSE (Stock Code: HERITGFOOD).

Heritage Foods has its headquarters in Hyderabad, India.

The Dairy Brand - Heritage 
Heritage by choosing Chittoor district of Andhra Pradesh as its primary procurement base of milk, had taken full advantage of the large, high yielding and cross-bred cow population found in the area.

Today Heritage has network in the states of Telangana, Andhra Pradesh, Karnataka, Tamil Nadu, Maharashtra and Delhi for procurement and distribution of quality milk and milk products. Heritage products are also distributed in the state of Kerala. Heritage has drawn plans to be a pan-India player in the dairy.

Products
 
Heritage's dairy range of products among others include milk, curd, ice cream, buttermilk, flavored milk, dairy whitener, skim milk powder. The Fresh range of products include 177 sku's of fresh fruits and vegetables, 150 sku's of in house bakery products and the private labels Farmers' Pride like cereals, pulses, staples, and spices.

References

Further reading 
 
  — plants commissioned by the company in 2003
 

Dairy products companies of India
Companies based in Hyderabad, India
Industries in Hyderabad, India
Agriculture companies established in 1992
Food and drink companies established in 1992
Indian companies established in 1992
1992 establishments in Andhra Pradesh
Indian brands
Companies listed on the National Stock Exchange of India
Companies listed on the Bombay Stock Exchange